Okna (Russian Окна - The Windows in English) is a Russian television tabloid talk show, hosted by Dmitry Nagiyev. Okna is ostensibly a talk show where troubled or dysfunctional families come to discuss their problems before a studio audience so that the audience or host can offer suggestions on what can be done to resolve their situations.

The show has become very popular on Russian television. It received attention in the UK after a fight was televised on Tarrant On TV, which has also led to its popularity growing on the internet via YouTube.

References

STS (TV channel) original programming
TNT (Russian TV channel) original programming
2000s Russian television series
2002 Russian television series debuts
2005 Russian television series endings
Russian television talk shows